Jeníkov is the name of several locations in the Czech Republic:

 Jeníkov (Chrudim District), village in the Pardubice Region
 Jeníkov (Teplice District), village in the Ústí nad Labem Region
 Golčův Jeníkov, town in Havlíčkův Brod District, Vysočina Region
 Větrný Jeníkov, village in the Jihlava District, Vysočina Region